Hammons is a surname. Notable people with the surname include:

David Hammons (born 1943), American artist
David Hammons (Maine politician) (1808–1888), American politician
Debbie Hammons (born 1950), American politician
E. W. Hammons (1882–1962), American film producer
Edden Hammons (1876–1955), American fiddler
Foy Hammons, American football player and coach
John Q. Hammons (1919–2013), American businessman
John Tyler Hammons (born 1988), American politician
Joseph Hammons (1787–1836), American politician

See also
Hammon (disambiguation)